Jeidi Pradera Bernal (born 17 February 1998) is a Cuban professional racing cyclist, who most recently rode for the UCI Women's Team  in the 2019 women's road cycling season.

References

External links

1998 births
Living people
Cuban female cyclists
Place of birth missing (living people)
Cyclists at the 2019 Pan American Games
Pan American Games competitors for Cuba
20th-century Cuban women
21st-century Cuban women